Ivan Manayenko (5 December 1919 – 1985) was a Soviet fencer. He competed in the individual and team sabre events at the 1952 Summer Olympics.

References

External links
 

1919 births
1985 deaths
Soviet male fencers
Olympic fencers of the Soviet Union
Fencers at the 1952 Summer Olympics